Rectoris luxiensis is a species of cyprinid of the genus Rectoris. It inhabits inland wetlands in China, and has been assessed as "data deficient" on the IUCN Red List. It is used for food locally.

References

Cyprinid fish of Asia
Freshwater fish of China
IUCN Red List data deficient species